Inwood is a surname. Notable people with the surname include:

George Inwood (1906–1940), Home Guard Section Commander posthumously awarded the George Cross
Glenn Inwood (born 1968), New Zealand public relations specialist
Henry William Inwood (1794–1843), English architect and classical scholar, the son of architect William Inwood
Roy Inwood (1890–1971), Australian recipient of the Victoria Cross
Richard Inwood (born 1946), the Bishop of Bedford
Steve Inwood (born 1947), American actor
William Inwood (c. 1771 – 1843), English architect